Waiting to Exhale is a 1995 American romance film directed by Forest Whitaker (in his feature film directorial debut) and starring Whitney Houston and Angela Bassett. The film was adapted from the 1992 novel of the same name by Terry McMillan. Lela Rochon, Loretta Devine, Dennis Haysbert, Michael Beach, Gregory Hines, Donald Faison, and Mykelti Williamson rounded out the rest of the cast. The original music score was composed by Kenneth "Babyface" Edmonds. The story centers on four women living in the Phoenix, Arizona, area and their relationships with men and one another. All of them are "holding their breath" until the day they can feel comfortable in a committed relationship with themselves.

Plot
Four friends (Savannah, Robin, Bernadine, and Gloria) get together frequently to support one another and listen to each other vent about life and love. They each want to be in a romantic relationship, but they each have difficulties finding a good man.

Successful television producer Savannah "Vannah" Jackson believes that one day her married lover will leave his wife for her. She later realizes that he won't, and that she must find her own man who will love her for who she really is.

Bernadine "Bernie" Harris, who abandoned her career and dreams of having a catering business, instead raised a family and supported her husband John in building his business. He announces he is leaving her for a white woman with whom he works, sending her into an emotional tailspin that culminates in the two fighting over their assets after she burns his car, clothes and some of his other belongings, and then sells the rest of his things for a dollar each, and he retaliates by draining their bank accounts.

Robin Stokes is a high-powered executive and the long-time mistress of married Russell. After dumping him, she has problems finding someone suitable.

Beauty salon owner Gloria "Glo" Matthews is a single mother. Her ex-husband and the father of her son tells her that he was always bisexual and now realizes he is gay. Gloria eventually falls in love with a new neighbor, Marvin King.

The situations all resolve themselves for the better. Savannah ends up permanently dumping her married lover. Bernadine gets a large divorce settlement from her ex-husband and finds love with a widowed civil rights attorney who encourages her to pursue her catering dream. Robin ends up pregnant by her married lover, but dumps him, and chooses to raise the baby on her own.
Gloria apologizes to her neighbor for snapping at him when he suggested that she should let her son grow up and experience the world. She learns not to be so protective of her son and lets him go on an "Up with People" trip to Spain. She finds love while learning to take care of herself rather than being self-sacrificing in her devotion to her son and her business.

Cast
 Whitney Houston as Savannah Jackson, a successful television producer who after few failed relationships, decides to move from Denver, Colorado to Phoenix, Arizona
 Angela Bassett as Bernadine Harris, a mother of two children with dreams of starting a catering business shelved by her 11-year marriage to her husband, only for him to drop a bomb: he's divorcing her for his white bookkeeper.
 Loretta Devine as Gloria Matthews, a beauty salon owner & single mother of Tarik
 Lela Rochon as Robin Stokes, an executive and the long-time mistress of Russell
 Gregory Hines as Marvin King, Gloria's neighbor with whom she falls in love, decides to move from Nevada to Phoenix, Arizona
 Dennis Haysbert as Kenneth Dawkins, Savannah's married lover
 Mykelti Williamson as Troy, Robin's one-time lover
 Michael Beach as John Harris Sr., Bernie's husband who leaves her for a white woman
 Donald Adeosun Faison as Tarik Matthews, Gloria's teenage son
 Leon Robinson as Russell, Robin's long-time married lover
 Wendell Pierce as Michael Davenport, Robin's co-worker and one-night stand
 Jeffrey D. Sams as Lionel, Savannah's New Year's Eve date
 Jazz Raycole as Onika Harris, Bernadine & John Sr.'s daughter
 Brandon Hammond as John Harris Jr., Bernadine & John Sr.'s son
 Kenya Moore as Denise, Lionel's "friend" who sees Savannah as a rival
 Lamont Johnson as Joseph, Lionel's "friend"
 Starletta DuPois as "Ma", Savannah's mother who wants her daughter with a man, preferably Kenneth
 Kelly Preston as Kathleen, John Sr.'s bookkeeper for whom he's leaving his wife Bernadine (uncredited)
 Wesley Snipes as James Wheeler, a civil rights attorney Bernadine shares an intimate moment with (uncredited)
 Giancarlo Esposito as David Matthews, Gloria's ex-husband and father of Tarik (uncredited)

Production

Filming
Parts of the film were shot at Monument Valley in Utah as well as Chandler, Fountain Hills, Phoenix and Paradise Valley in Arizona. Filming was temporarily halted for seven days after Houston suffered a drug overdose.

Music

The soundtrack album to the film features exclusively female African-American artists. The soundtrack includes the number-one hit songs "Exhale (Shoop Shoop)", sung by the film's star, Whitney Houston, and "Let It Flow" by Toni Braxton as well as "Not Gon' Cry" by Mary J. Blige, "Sittin' Up in My Room" by Brandy, and "Count on Me" by Whitney Houston and CeCe Winans, all of which reached the top ten of Billboard's Hot 100 chart.

Reception

Box office
Waiting to Exhale was a financial success, opening at number one at the North American box office and grossing $14.1 million its first weekend of release. In total, the film grossed $67.05 million in North America, and $14.4 million internationally, for a total worldwide gross of $81.45 million. Its widest release was just over 1,400 theatres, and it was the 26th highest-grossing film of 1995.

Critical response
Upon release, the film received mixed reviews from critics. Film critic Susan Stark from The Detroit News stated, "For all the pleasure there is in seeing effective, great-looking black women grappling with major life issues on screen, Waiting to Exhale is an uneven piece." Reviewer Liam Lacey from The Daily Globe and Mail wrote of the film, "[It] never escapes the queasy aura of Melrose Place: just another story about naive people with small problems." However, film critic Roger Ebert positively reviewed the film, stating that it is "an escapist fantasy that women in the audience can enjoy by musing, 'I wish I had her problems'—and her car, house, wardrobe, figure and men, even wrong men." The film is notable for having an all-African-American cast. The Los Angeles Times called it a "social phenomenon". The film received a 61% approval rating at review aggregator website Rotten Tomatoes, based on 31 reviews. The site's consensus states: "Waiting to Exhale looks at life's ups and downs from an underseen perspective -- albeit one that's poorly served by uneven acting and a sporadically interesting story."

In the book Is Marriage for White People? writer and Stanford Law School professor Ralph Richard Banks states that the film is a perfect example of the problems African-American women have in finding serious relationships.

Accolades
 Image Awards
 Outstanding Lead Actress in a Motion Picture:
 (Angela Bassett) Winner
 (Whitney Houston) Nominated
 Outstanding Soundtrack: Winner
 Outstanding Motion Picture: Winner
 Outstanding Lead Actor in a Motion Picture: (Gregory Hines) Nominated
 Outstanding Supporting Actress in a Motion Picture:
 (Loretta Devine) Winner
 (Lela Rochon) Nominated
 MTV Movie Awards
 Best Female Breakthrough Performance: (Lela Rochon) Nominated
 Best Song from a Movie:
 Whitney Houston - "Exhale (Shoop Shoop)"
 Brandy - "Sittin' Up in My Room"

Proposed sequel
Interviewed in the spring of 2011 on an episode of The Talk, Angela Bassett confirmed that a sequel was in the planning stages, with all the female principals signed on to star, and Whitaker returning to direct. The film would supposedly be based on McMillan's 2010 follow-up novel, Getting to Happy; McMillan was adapting the book to screenplay. However, the 2012 death of Whitney Houston halted plans for a sequel starring all four of the original leads.

Television adaptation
In November 2020, it was reported that ABC was developing a television series adaptation of film. The series will be produced by 20th Television with Lee Daniels as executive producer, under a deal of Daniels at 20th Television.

References

External links
 
 
 
 

1995 films
1990s romantic comedy-drama films
American romantic comedy-drama films
1990s English-language films
Films directed by Forest Whitaker
African-American films
Novels by Terry McMillan
1990s female buddy films
Films based on American novels
Films based on romance novels
Films set in Phoenix, Arizona
20th Century Fox films
Films with screenplays by Ronald Bass
Films shot in Utah
Films shot in Arizona
1995 directorial debut films
1995 comedy films
1995 drama films
American female buddy films
1990s American films
Films shot in Monument Valley